Mervyn Edward Griffin Jr. (July 6, 1925 – August 12, 2007) was an American television show host and media mogul. He began his career as a radio and big band singer, later appearing in film and on Broadway. From 1965 to 1986 he hosted his own talk show, The Merv Griffin Show. He also created the game shows Jeopardy! and Wheel of Fortune through his production companies, Merv Griffin Enterprises and Merv Griffin Entertainment.

Early life
Griffin was born July 6, 1925, in San Mateo, California, to Mervyn Edward Griffin Sr., a stockbroker, and Rita Elizabeth Griffin (née Robinson), a homemaker. He had an older sister, Barbara. When he was a child, Griffin used to play Hangman games with his sister during family road trips. It was these games which inspired him to create the game show Wheel of Fortune in 1975. The family was Irish American. Raised as a Catholic, Griffin started singing in his church choir as a boy, and by his teens was earning extra money as a church organist. His abilities as a pianist played a part in his early entry into show business.

He attended San Mateo High School, graduating in 1942, and continued to aid in financing the school. He attended San Mateo Junior College and then the University of San Francisco. He was a member of the international fraternity Tau Kappa Epsilon.

During World War II, Griffin was declared 4F after failing several military physical examinations due to a slight heart murmur. During the Korean War several years later, he was examined and deemed healthy enough to serve, but by that time was above age 26 and exempt from the draft.

Career

Singing
Griffin started as a singer on radio at age 19, appearing on San Francisco Sketchbook, a nationally syndicated program based at KFRC. He was overweight as an adolescent and a young man, which disappointed some radio fans when they saw him in person. He wrote years later in his autobiography that there was a deliberate effort to keep the public from finding out how he looked. He resolved to change his appearance, and lost 80 pounds in four months.

Freddy Martin heard him on the radio show and asked him to tour with his orchestra, which he did for four years.

By 1945, Griffin had earned enough money to form his own record label, Panda Records, which produced Songs by Merv Griffin, the first U.S. album ever recorded on magnetic tape. In 1947, he had a 15-minute Monday-to-Friday singing program on KFRC in San Francisco.

He became increasingly popular with nightclub audiences, and his fame soared among the general public with his 1950 hit "I've Got a Lovely Bunch of Coconuts". The song reached the #1 spot on the Hit Parade and sold three million copies.

 
At one of his nightclub performances, Griffin was discovered by Doris Day. Day arranged for a screen test at the Warner Bros. Studios for a role in By the Light of the Silvery Moon (1953). Griffin did not get the part, but the screen test led to supporting roles in other musical films such as So This Is Love (also 1953), which caused a minor controversy when Griffin shared an open-mouthed kiss with Kathryn Grayson. The kiss was a first in Hollywood film history since the introduction of the Production Code in 1934. He also had an uncredited role as a radio announcer in the horror/science fiction film The Beast from 20,000 Fathoms (1953).

Griffin also appeared in The Boy from Oklahoma and Phantom of the Rue Morgue (both 1954), but became disillusioned with movie-making. He bought his contract back from Warner Bros. and decided to devote his attention to a new medium: television.

In 1954, Griffin appeared in several Cinécraft Productions sponsored films including a musical, Milestones of Motoring with Joe E. Brown and Rita Farrell. He decided to spend the summer of 1954 in New York City. He landed a job as the host of a new television show, CBS-TV's Summer Holiday, a summer replacement for Jane Froman's U.S.A. Canteen and Jo Stafford's The Jo Stafford Show, which he co-hosted with Betty Ann Grove. Griffin and Grove were brought together by Byron Paul, producer of U.S.A. Canteen, and Irving Mansfield, Summer Holiday's creator. The new show featured live music with two singers while simulating a trip to various places in the world. Mansfield had remembered Griffin from his singing in the Grace Moore picture So This Is Love, and for his hit song "I've Got a Lovely Bunch of Coconuts." Paul had already signed Grove for the show and was looking for a male co-host. It ran for one summer.

That summer, Griffin became acquainted with music publisher Loring Buzzell. Griffin needed a place to stay and moved-in with Buzzell as his new roommate. They had much in common and became instant friends, and Buzzell introduced Griffin to all of New York City's popular musicians and music executives. Buzzell was engaged to popular singer Lu Ann Simms, with a wedding date set for July 24, 1954. Griffin later claimed in interviews that he was best man at their wedding, but was in fact one of the four ushers. After the wedding, and about two months after arriving in the city, Griffin moved into a different apartment, but in the same building, and remained lifelong friends with Buzzell and Simms. When they had their first child, Cynthia Leigh Buzzell, on September 11, 1955, Griffin was named her godfather. Buzzell died of a heart attack in 1959, but Griffin stayed close to Simms for the rest of her life and had her as a guest on his talk show many times.

Game show host
From 1958 to 1962, Griffin hosted Play Your Hunch, a game show produced by Mark Goodson and Bill Todman. It ran on all three networks, but primarily NBC. He also hosted a primetime ABC game show, Keep Talking. He also filled in for a week for the vacationing Bill Cullen on The Price Is Right, and for Bud Collyer on To Tell the Truth. In 1963, NBC offered him the opportunity to host a new game show, Word for Word, which Griffin produced. He also produced Let's Play Post Office for NBC in 1965, Reach for the Stars for NBC in 1967, and One in a Million for ABC in 1967.

Talk show host
Griffin scored a coup when Tonight Show host Jack Paar accidentally emerged onto the set of Play Your Hunch during a live broadcast, and Griffin got him to stay for a spontaneous interview. Both programs shared Studio 6B at NBC's Rockefeller Center complex at the time, with Play Your Hunch airing live in the morning while Tonight taped later in the day. After Paar left The Tonight Show, but before Johnny Carson took over (Carson was still hosting Who Do You Trust? for ABC), Griffin was one of the many guest hosts who presided over Tonight in the interim. Griffin was considered the most successful of the guest hosts, and was rewarded with his own daytime talk show on NBC in 1962. The live 55-minute program was not successful, however, and was cancelled in 1963.

In 1965, Griffin launched a syndicated talk show for Group W (Westinghouse Broadcasting) titled The Merv Griffin Show. It aired in a variety of time slots throughout North America; many stations ran it in the daytime, others aired it in primetime, and a few broadcast it opposite Johnny Carson's The Tonight Show. Griffin's announcer/sidekick was veteran British character actor Arthur Treacher, who had been his mentor. When Treacher left the show in 1970, Griffin did the announcing himself, and walked on stage with the phrase "And now... here I come!" According to an obituary on August 24, 2007 in Entertainment Weekly, The Merv Griffin Show ran for 21 years and won eleven Emmy Awards.

Griffin was not shy about tackling controversial subjects, especially the Vietnam War. The guests on the Westinghouse show were an eclectic mix of entertainers, authors, politicians, and "personality" performers like Zsa Zsa Gabor. Griffin also booked controversial guests like George Carlin, Dick Gregory, Richard Pryor, Norman Mailer and Bertrand Russell. He was commended for booking such guests, but also widely criticized for it. When philosopher and anti-war activist Bertrand Russell used the show to condemn the war in Vietnam, Griffin was criticized for letting Russell have his say. Arnold Schwarzenegger, later 38th governor of California, made his U.S. talk show debut on Griffin's show in 1974 after emigrating from Austria.

Griffin dedicated two shows, in 1975 and 1977, to Transcendental Meditation and its founder Maharishi Mahesh Yogi. The second show aired as a standalone special in some regions such as Canada. Griffin himself was an enthusiastic meditator.

Griffin frequently chatted with audience members. One regular attendee, Lillian Miller, became a fixture on the show throughout its run.

Robert (Bob) Murphy, Griffin's best friend since sixth grade, was the producer of The Merv Griffin Show, and eventually became president of Merv Griffin Enterprises.

Late-night host
CBS gave Griffin a late-night show opposite Carson in 1969. Griffin's three-year run at CBS was contentious; the network was uncomfortable with the guests he wanted, who often spoke out against the Vietnam War and on other sensitive topics. When political activist Abbie Hoffman was his guest in April 1970, CBS blurred the video of Hoffman so viewers at home would not see his trademark American flag pattern shirt, even though other guests had worn the same shirt in the past, uncensored. Griffin disliked the censorship imposed by CBS and complained.

Sensing that his time at CBS was ending, and tired of the network's restrictions, Griffin secretly signed a contract with rival company Metromedia that gave him a syndicated daytime talk show deal as soon as CBS canceled their show. When he was fired a few months later, his new show began the following Monday, and ran until the mid-1980s. By 1986, Griffin was ready to retire. Profits from his highly successful game shows made him one of the world's wealthiest entertainers.

Game show creator
Griffin created and produced the successful television game show Jeopardy! in 1964. In an Associated Press profile released before it premiered, he discussed the show's origins:

The show, originally titled What's the Question?, premiered on NBC on March 30, 1964, hosted by Art Fleming, and ran for 11 years. Griffin wrote the 30-second piece of music heard during the show's Final Jeopardy! Round, which became the iconic melody of the theme for the syndicated version of the show hosted by Alex Trebek in 1984.

In 1975, NBC canceled Jeopardy! after moving it twice on its daytime schedule, despite having an additional year on its network contract. Griffin produced the show's successor, Wheel of Fortune, which premiered January 6, 1975 with host Chuck Woolery and hostess Susan Stafford, and had high ratings throughout its network run. From December 1975 to January 1976, it was expanded to an hour, in response to the successful 60-minute version of The Price Is Right on CBS.

Wheel barely escaped cancellation in 1980, when NBC replaced three of its other game shows with a daytime talk show starring David Letterman. NBC finally cancelled it in 1989, when CBS picked it up for a year (only to return to NBC, when the daytime version was finally cancelled permanently in 1991). The show became a phenomenon when, on September 19, 1983, a nighttime version hit the syndication market with Pat Sajak and Vanna White as host and hostess. Around that time, Griffin composed the show's best-known theme song, "Changing Keys", which was used in several variants of the show until 2000. The theme returned to the show in 2021 at the start of season 39.

Two revivals of Jeopardy! were produced: one on NBC that ran for five months in late 1978/early 1979, with Art Fleming returning as host; and the other airing in first-run syndication beginning September 10, 1984, starring Alex Trebek. The syndicated versions of both Jeopardy! and Wheel remain on the air today.

In 1990, Griffin had an ambitious but unsuccessful attempt at adapting the venerable board game Monopoly into a game show of the same name. His last game show was a wild show called Ruckus, which emanated from the Resorts International Hotel & Casino in Atlantic City, which he owned at the time. Involving slapstick stunts and a somewhat truncated version of his old Reach for the Stars, it initially aired locally in New York, with the intent of national syndication early the following year. The Amazing Johnathan left the show after 65 episodes because of a contract dispute, and it was scrapped before it was nationally syndicated. National audiences eventually got a look at it via reruns that aired on GSN.

On his retirement, Griffin sold his production company, Merv Griffin Enterprises, to Columbia Pictures Television—then a unit of The Coca-Cola Company—for US$250 million on May 6, 1986. At the time, it was the largest sale of an entertainment company owned by a single individual, and Forbes pronounced Griffin history's richest Hollywood performer. He retained the title of creator of both his game shows.

The two powerhouses spun off numerous programs, for which Griffin often signed on as a creative consultant. The spin-offs included the children's shows Wheel 2000 (CBS, 1997), and the short-lived Jep! (GSN, 1998, both for children); Rock & Roll Jeopardy! (VH1, 1998) for pop-music trivia fans; Click!, a teen-oriented game that introduced Ryan Seacrest as its host; and, in association with Wink Martindale, Headline Chasers (1985).

On May 14, 2003, Griffin was honored with the Broadcast Music, Inc. (BMI) President's Award at its annual Film and Television Awards ceremony, for creating some of America's best-known game show melodies.

In 2007, Griffin's production company, Merv Griffin Entertainment, began production on a new syndicated game show, Merv Griffin's Crosswords (originally titled Let's Play Crosswords and Let's Do Crosswords). It taped in Los Angeles after initial reports that it would be produced at WMAQ-TV in Chicago. Produced in association with Program Partners and the William Morris Agency, it began airing September 10, 2007. NBC-owned and -operated stations in New York, Los Angeles, Chicago, San Francisco and Dallas carried it, with many stations airing two episodes per day. It lasted only one season, with its last episode on May 16, 2008, but has had reruns on various channels.

Business ventures

Griffin ventured into real estate, purchasing the Beverly Hilton Hotel in 1987.

In 1988, he purchased Resorts International and two of their hotels, one in Atlantic City, New Jersey; and another on Paradise Island in the Bahamas, from Donald Trump and other investors. Part of the deal was that Trump would buy Resorts' interest in the yet-to-be-constructed Taj Mahal project for $273 million, and that Trump would own Resorts International Air, which included three Sikorsky S-61 helicopters. In early 1988, Trump wanted to take Resorts private; but Griffin, through Griffin Gaming & Entertainment, offered the minority shareholders significantly more than Trump in April 1988. After Trump paid $101 million for Resorts International Inc. in 1987, Griffin bought it back from him for $365 million and assumed the hotel-casino's debt of $925 million on November 15, 1988. After ten months of ownership, Griffin reported a loss of $46.6 million. He had used $325 million in junk bond financing at nearly 14% from Drexel Burnham Lambert's Michael Milken, but suspended interest payments in early 1989. Cashflow was about $70 million short of what was needed to service the Resorts' debt in 1989, and Griffin sought bankruptcy court protection for Resorts on December 23, 1989.

The background to this was on November 12, when Resorts reached a tentative agreement with certain bondholders, several bondholders petitioned the United States Bankruptcy Court in Camden, New Jersey, to put the company into involuntary bankruptcy to protect legal claims they might have against Trump, the real estate investor Griffin outbid for Resorts the prior year. As a result, this literally wiped out or greatly reduced the investments of the bondholders, so that Mr. Griffin could sue Trump and yet still retain a significant portion for himself.

Besides Resorts International, the holding company for casinos in Atlantic City and the Bahamas, three company affiliates also filed for Chapter 11 protection: Griffin Resorts Inc., Resorts International Financing Inc. and Griffin Resorts Holding Inc.

An active desert resident, Griffin was a supporter of the La Quinta Arts Festival and the owner of the Merv Griffin Givenchy Resort & Spa in Palm Springs, now The Parker. He owned a ranch near La Quinta, California where he raised thoroughbred racehorses, and St. Clerans Manor, a boutique hotel in an eighteenth-century estate once owned by director John Huston, near Craughwell, in County Galway, Ireland. In the 1980s, Griffin purchased the Paradise Island Resort and Casino in the Bahamas for $400 million from Trump, but later sold it for just $125 million. Griffin sold his empire to The Coca-Cola Company for $250 million in 1986, then went on a buying spree of hotels, so that his wealth in 2003 was said to be around $1.2 billion.

Personal life
Griffin was married to the former Julann Wright from 1958 to 1976; they remained friends after their divorce. They had one son, Tony Griffin, born in 1959; who had two children of his own. In an interview with The New York Times published on May 26, 2005, Griffin recalled a quip he frequently used when asked about his private life: "I tell everybody that I'm a quarter-sexual. I will do anything with anybody for a quarter." He was otherwise secretive about his business and personal lives.

In 1991, Deney Terrio, host of the Griffin-created Dance Fever, sued Griffin, alleging sexual harassment, but the suit was dismissed. That year, Brent Plott, a longtime employee who worked as a bodyguard, horse trainer and driver, filed a $200 million palimony lawsuit, which was also dismissed. Griffin characterized both lawsuits as extortion. His Los Angeles Times obituary repeated a 1991 statement he had made regarding Plott's lawsuit: "This is a shameless attempt to extort money from me. This former bodyguard and horse trainer was paid $250 a week, lived in one of two apartments underneath my former house as part of his security function, and left my payroll six or seven years ago. His charges are ridiculous and untrue."

Griffin was a constant companion of actress Eva Gabor from the mid-1980s until her death in 1995, though she told the press in 1990 that they had never been lovers.

After Griffin's death, The Hollywood Reporter published a report stating that he had been a closeted gay man. The article was later altered due to protests from his friends and business associates.

On being wealthy, Griffin said, "when you walk down the street and everybody knows you're rich, they don't talk to you." He kept his wealth an open secret, amassing media outlets, hotels and casinos with a net worth estimated at more than $1 billion. He said that he did not know his actual worth because it "would keep me from sleeping at night".

Griffin and First Lady Nancy Reagan exchanged birthday greetings each July 6 for their shared birthday. This continued after her two terms as First Lady.  Griffin was also an honorary pallbearer at the funeral of President Ronald Reagan in 2004, having been the Reagans' friends for many years. He was a longtime member of the Republican Party.

Honors
In 1974, Griffin was inducted to the Hollywood Walk of Fame. In 1998, a Golden Palm Star on the Walk of Stars in Palm Springs was dedicated to him. In 2005 he accepted the degree of Doctor of Laws (honoris causa) from the National University of Ireland, Galway; and in 2008 was posthumously inducted into the Television Hall of Fame.

Illness and death

Griffin's prostate cancer, treated originally in 1996, returned and he was admitted to Cedars Sinai Medical Center in Los Angeles, where his condition deteriorated, leading to his death on August 12, 2007 at the age of 82.

Funeral services were held on August 17, 2007 at the Church of the Good Shepherd in Beverly Hills. The well-attended service included Nancy Reagan; Arnold Schwarzenegger, who gave the eulogy with Tony Griffin; Maria Shriver; and various actors, television stars, employees, and friends, including Pat Sajak, Vanna White, Alex Trebek, Dick Van Dyke, Jack Klugman, Dick Van Patten, Ellen DeGeneres, Portia de Rossi, Ryan Seacrest, Johnny Mathis, Catherine Oxenberg and Casper Van Dien. Pallbearers included Griffin Group vice-chairman Ron Ward, President Robert Pritchard, and Vice President Michael Eyre, as well as Tony Griffin. His 7-year-old grandson Donovan Mervyn was an honorary pallbearer, as was Nancy Reagan. His 12-year-old granddaughter Farah gave a reading. A post-burial reception was held at the Beverly Hilton, owned by Griffin from 1987 to 2003. He was buried in Westwood Village Memorial Park Cemetery, where his epitaph reads "I will not be right back after this message". (He revealed the epitaph on The Late Late Show with Tom Snyder. In his book Merv, written with David Bender in 2003, he stated that it would be "Stay Tuned".)

GSN honored Griffin by airing ten-episode marathons of Wheel and Jeopardy! during the weekend of August 18–19, 2007. The Wheel marathon included two episodes with cameo appearances by Griffin: Sajak's departure from the daytime version in 1989 and a 1992–93 episode that ended with Griffin, his band "The MervTones," and White singing at a dinner club in Orlando, Florida. The Jeopardy! marathon consisted of a rerun of the Jeopardy! Million Dollar Masters Tournament from 2002.

Griffin's home was sold for $7 million.

Selected popular songs
Some of the songs Griffin recorded were:
 "I've Got a Lovely Bunch of Coconuts"
 "Christmas City"
 "Wilhelmina"
 "Never Been Kissed"
 "The Charanga" (#69, Pop Charts, 1961)
 "Banned in Boston" (#101, Pop Charts, 1961)
 "Happy To Know You" (Radio Hit, 1973)
 "Think!" (longtime theme music for Jeopardy!)
 "Changing Keys" (longtime theme music for Wheel)

Notes

References

External links

 Official site
 
 

 

1925 births
2007 deaths
20th-century American male actors
20th-century American singers
American game show hosts
American hoteliers
American male film actors
American male musical theatre actors
American male radio actors
American people of Irish descent
American racehorse owners and breeders
American real estate businesspeople
American television talk show hosts
American television composers
Burials at Westwood Village Memorial Park Cemetery
Daytime Emmy Award winners
Deaths from cancer in California
Deaths from prostate cancer
Jeopardy!
People from La Quinta, California
People from San Mateo, California
RCA Victor artists
Television producers from California
Transcendental Meditation exponents
Wheel of Fortune (franchise)
20th-century American male singers